Leicester Ofa Ki Wales Twickenham Fainga'anuku (born 11 October 1999) is a Tongan born New Zealand rugby union player who plays for  in the Bunnings NPC competition and the  in Super Rugby. His position of choice is wing.

Early career
Fainga'anuku was educated at Nelson College, where he was captain of the school's top side.

His father Malakai Fainga’anuku played prop for Tonga in the 1999 Rugby World Cup. During one of the games during the World Cup, in which Tonga beat Italy, at Welford Road Stadium, Leicester, England. Malakai named his son after the city in honour of the game. Wales was used as one of his middle names as the hosts and Twickenham was named after Twickenham Stadium where Tonga were due to play their next match.

Tasman
Fainga'anuku was named in the Tasman Mako squad for the 2018 Mitre 10 Cup and made his debut in Round 8 when  played  at Forsyth Barr Stadium in Dunedin coming off the bench in a 21–47 win for the Mako. He was part of the Tasman team that won the Mitre 10 Cup for the first time in 2019. He was again part of the Mako side that won the 2020 Mitre 10 Cup.

Crusaders
Fainga'anuku was named in the  squad for the 2019 Super Rugby season signing him on a three year deal. In 2020 Leicester made 11 appearances as the Crusaders won Super Rugby Aotearoa. Fainga’anuku starred during the 2021 Super Rugby Aotearoa season as the side won their fifth title in a row.

North v South
Fainga'anuku was named in the South Island squad for the North vs South rugby union match in 2020, coming off the bench in a 38–35 win for the South.

Moana Pasifika
Fainga'anuku was named in the Moana Pasifika squad to play the Maori All Blacks in late 2020, starting in the number 14 jersey in a 28–21 loss.

All Blacks
After being one of the best players during the 2022 Super Rugby season, Fainga'anuku was selected in the year's first All Black squad. He was named to debut as a starting winger in the first of three tests against Ireland in July. New Zealand won the match 42–19, with Fainga'anuku becoming All Black number 1200.

References

External link
 

1999 births
Living people
People educated at Nelson College
New Zealand rugby union players
Rugby union wings
Tasman rugby union players
Crusaders (rugby union) players
Rugby union centres
Moana Pasifika players
New Zealand international rugby union players